Citizens National Bank is a historic bank building located at Springville, Erie County, New York. It was built in 1939, and is a two-story, five bay, square brick building with Moderne style design elements. The interior features a mural titled "Credit Man's Confidence in Man" and painted by noted artist Louis Grell. The building housed a bank until 1968 when it was sold to the Village of Springville. The building was listed on the National Register of Historic Places in 1996. There is also a fallout shelter inside with five inch concrete walls and capabilities to hold up to 400 people for 6 months

References

Bank buildings on the National Register of Historic Places in New York (state)
Commercial buildings completed in 1939
Buildings and structures in Erie County, New York
Moderne architecture in New York (state)
National Register of Historic Places in Erie County, New York